Aleksandr Andreyevich Shustov, born 29 June 1984) is a male high jumper from Russia, best known for winning the gold medal in the men's high jump at the 2007 Summer Universiade in Bangkok, Thailand.
On 29 July at the 2010 European Athletics Championships in Barcelona, Spain (that was held at the Estadi Olímpic Lluís Companys) he achieved his personal best (2.33 metres) and won gold medal.

2011 Competitions
Shustov began the 2011 indoor season by winning the Lukashevich Memorial in Cheliabinsk on 9 January, with a first attempt clearance of 2.27: two others also cleared 2.27, but they required two attempts. At the end of the month, he won 
the opening leg of the 7th annual Moravia High Jump Tour in the Czech Republic at Třinec on 26 January. He and fellow Russian Sergey Mudrov both cleared 2.29 m, with Shustov awarded the win based on his one miss at his first try at the winning height, while Mudrov needed all three attempts to clear 2.29. At the second stop on the Tour at Hustopece, Russians swept the top four places, with Shustov's 2.30 placing third, to Aleksei Dmitrik's 2.32, and Ivan Ukhov's world-leading 2.38. At the Moscow High Jump Cup on 3 February, Shustov finished tied for second at 2.27, behind Ukhov's winning 2.30.

Doping 
On 5 June 2020, Shustov was banned from athletics for four years for anti-doping violations despite retiring from the sport in 2017. His results from 8 July 2013 to 7 July 2017 were disqualified, including his 7th-place finish at the 2013 world championships in his home country. The Athletics Integrity Unit later confirmed that it was the first time that evidence from scratches and marks on urine sample bottles, as stated in the McLaren Report, was accepted as evidence.

International competitions

See also
List of doping cases in athletics

References

External links 

 Profile at the ARAF

1984 births
Living people
Sportspeople from Karaganda
Russian male high jumpers
Olympic male high jumpers
Olympic athletes of Russia
Athletes (track and field) at the 2012 Summer Olympics
Universiade gold medalists in athletics (track and field)
Universiade gold medalists for Russia
Medalists at the 2007 Summer Universiade
World Athletics Championships athletes for Russia
European Athletics Championships winners
European Athletics Championships medalists
Russian Athletics Championships winners
Doping cases in athletics
Russian sportspeople in doping cases